Karl Chandler is an Australian writer and light entertainer. He co-hosts the popular comedy podcast The Little Dum Dum Club with Tommy Dassalo. Chandler was born on 30 March 1976, and he grew up in the small rural Victorian town of Maryborough. Chandler now spends a majority of his time in Thailand, where, alongside Dassalo, he has hosted the Koh Samui International Podcast Festival since 2017. The festival attracts hundreds of fans internationally and showcases some of the finest comedians such as Logie winner Dilruk Jayasinha, Nick Capper and Brett Blake. 

Chandler was part of the supporting cast of, and wrote for, the sketch program Studio A. He has also written for TV shows such as Hard Quiz, The Chase Australia, Spicks and Specks and The Project. Chandler was credited as one of the writers for the one-off Reunion Special of Spicks and Specks, aired on the ABC in late 2018. He is currently working on pre-production for Phunny Phellas, a comedy program for commercial television audiences.

On 2 September 2017, Chandler married his then fiancée Diane, who he had been in a relationship with for 10 years. He invited many of his comedian friends such as Nick Cody, Fiona O'Loughlin, Luke McGregor, David Tulk, and Nick Capper. 
In 2011, Chandler collated and published a book called Funny Buggers: The Best Lines from Australian Stand-up Comedy. It is a collection of jokes from great Aussie comedians such as Greg Fleet, Tom Gleeson and Dave O'Neil. Chandler once auditioned for Australia's Got Talent, however did not make it past the audition stage.
Chandler runs many of the best comedy rooms in Melbourne, such as Comedy at Spleen on Monday nights (previously co-run with him and best friend Steele Saunders), Thursday Comedy Club on Thursday nights and Basement Comedy Club on Saturday nights. In the past, Chandler has also contributed to running comedy on Wednesday nights at Softbelly.
The Thursday and Saturday comedy nights are held at the Morris House on Exhibition Street, Melbourne.

Stand-up shows
2014 – Karl Chandler's Got Talent
2015 – Karl Chandler - World's Greatest (and Best) Comedian
2016 – Karl Chandler Defends His Title As World's Greatest and Best Comedian
2017 – Karl Chandler: World's Best Comedian in the World
2018 – Karl Chandler's Shit List
2019 – One Man Comedy Factory
2020–21 – Please Call Me Karl, Mr. Comedy Was My Father

References

1976 births
Living people
Australian comedians